Cheez TV was an Australian children's cartoon show, hosted by Ryan Lappin and Jade Gatt, that aired on weekday mornings on Network Ten. It began broadcasting on 17 July 1995 and it ended on 31 December 2004 with the presenters leaving. After eight months of being without presenters, it officially ended on 20 August 2005, and was replaced with Toasted TV.

In January 2016, Lappin and Gatt launched the official Cheez TV Facebook page with the help of friend and podcaster Brendan Dando. The page features full episodes of the show from its original run, behind the scenes photos and competitions.

Cheez TV was the first show in Australia to have an internet address in 1995.

History
Initially competing against Agro's Cartoon Connection on the Seven Network, the younger youth hosts, 'edgier' feel, and larger focus on showing cartoons allowed Ten to take the early morning children's TV crown off Seven.

During the show's run, Ryan Lappin was once nominated for Cleo magazine's Bachelor of the Year only to lose to Australian swimmer Geoff Huegill. Jade Gatt also hosted late night music show Ground Zero.

During the later years of the show, Lappin and Gatt's editorials were quickly becoming notorious for their use of more adult-oriented humour.

On 20 August 2005, the last episode of Cheez TV was broadcast after 10 years on the air, although Lappin and Gatt's final on-air appearance took place on 31 December 2004. In 2005, only cartoons showed during Cheez TV. It was later replaced with Toasted TV in the same time slot, which continues to screen series such as Naruto, One Piece and Winx Club.

In 2010, a Facebook event scheduled for 7 October 2010 appeared, attempting to gain interest in a Cheez TV reunion show. It quickly attracted the attention of Cheez TV fans. Jade and Ryan both had an interview with the E Team from U20 Radio Station which aired on 7 August 2010, where they briefly spoke to Peter Styles about the Facebook group and the show. However, after the group sent hundreds of petitioned emails to the networks, third parties made complaints which led to Facebook closing the group. It is unknown whether any consideration has been taken in relation to a Cheez TV reunion by any network contacted.

On 28 June 2011, the Adelaide Anime and Videogame Convention AVCon announced Cheez TV presenters Ryan Lappin and Jade Gatt as special guests. The pair appeared in multiple guest panels throughout the weekend.

On 22 January 2016, Ryan and Jade launched the official Cheez TV Facebook page with the help of friend and podcaster Brendan Dando, co-host of the Simpsons podcast 'Four Finger Discount', after Lappin discovered all of the tapes containing the episodes in his garage. The page features old episodes of the show as well as some new programming from Lappin and Gatt.

On 30 July 2017, Ryan and Jade started doing livestreams on Twitch, performing an impromptu version of the show.

Programming
Cheez TV had programming from a variety of different studios. Many of its shows were sourced from Saban Entertainment, before the company folded in the early 2000s. The two presenters, Jade Gatt and Ryan Lappin, editorialised and presented small variety segments in between cartoons. These short segments included parodies of Rove Live, Gardening Australia, Men in Black and numerous music video re-enactments. On occasion the hosts would interview special guests as well. For a period on The Big Cheez Gatt and Lappin were joined by another presenter, Lenka Kripac (member of Australian band Decoder Ring).

Cheez TV also aired during Saturday morning under the moniker of The Big Cheez.

Shows
The following is an incomplete list of series which were shown on Cheez TV in the past.

Action Man (1995)
Action Man (2000)
The Adventures of Jimmy Neutron: Boy Genius
The Adventures of Sam and Max: Freelance Police
Avenger Penguins
Adventures of Sonic the Hedgehog
The Adventures of T-Rex
The Avengers: United They Stand
Back to the Future
Bad Dog
Beethoven
Beverly Hills Teens
Beyblade
Beyblade G-Revolution
Beyblade V-Force
Big Bad Beetleborgs
[[Bill and Ted's Excellent Adventures(1990 TV series)  Biker Mice from MarsBruno the KidBureau of Alien DetectorsButt-Ugly MartiansBucky O'Hare and the Toad Wars C.O.P.S.Captain Simian and the Space MonkeysCardcaptorsConan the AdventurerCount DuckulaCrush Gear TurboDanger Mouse Dennis and GnasherDog CityDigimon AdventureDigimon Adventure 02Digimon FrontierDigimon TamersDragon Ball GTDragon Ball ZDragon FlyzDuel MastersDungeons & DragonsEagle RidersEarthworm JimEek! The CatExtreme DinosaursExtreme GhostbustersFievel's American TailsFighting FoodonsGadget & the GadgetinisGadget Boy & HeatherGarfield and FriendsGodzilla: The SeriesGravedale HighHamtaroHe-Man and the Masters of the Universe (1983)He-Man and the Masters of the Universe (2002)Hot Rod Dogs And Cool Car Cats Hot Wheels: AcceleRacers – IgnitionHot Wheels: AcceleRacers – The Speed of SilenceHulk Hogan's Rock 'n' WrestlingHurricanes (1993) The Incredible Hulk (1982 series)Inspector GadgetIznogoudJackie Chan AdventuresJayce and the Wheeled WarriorsJumanjiKaput and ZöskyThe Kids from Room 402The LittlesThe Marvel Action HourM.A.S.K.MedabotsMegaMan NT WarriorMen in Black: The SeriesMighty MaxThe New ArchiesThe New Woody Woodpecker ShowOne PiecePhantom InvestigatorsPokémon (Season 1-7)Pokémon: Indigo LeaguePokémon: Adventures on the Orange IslandsPokémon: The Johto JourneysPokémon: Johto League ChampionsPokémon: Master QuestPokémon: AdvancedPokémon: Advanced ChallengeProject G.e.e.K.e.R.Red PlanetRoboRoachRocket PowerRude DogRugratsSaber Rider And The Star Sheriffs Sailor MoonThe Savage DragonThe Secret Files of the Spy DogsSilver SurferSky DancersSonic X (Series 1)Sooty's Amazing Adventures Space Goofs (Series 1)Spider-Man (1967)Spider-Man: The Animated SeriesSpider-Man: The New Animated SeriesSpider-Man UnlimitedSpongeBob SquarePantsThe Spooktacular New Adventures of CasperStuart Little: The Animated SeriesStar Wars: Clone Wars (2003)Street SharksSuperior Defender Gundam Force (Series 1)Teenage Mutant Ninja Turtles (2003)TeknomanTenko and the Guardians of the MagicThe Adventures of the Galaxy RangersThe TickThundercats Totally Spies!TransformersTransformers: ArmadaTransformers: EnergonTransformers: Robots in Disguise (2001)Walter Melon (TV series)WildC.A.T.S.Willow TownWing Commander AcademyWinx ClubX-Men: The Animated SeriesYowie PowerYu-Gi-Oh! Duel MonstersZoids: Chaotic CenturyZoids: FuzorsZoids: New Century''

See also
 List of Australian television series
 Toasted TV

References

External links
 
 Cartoon schedule 2001 to 2005
 Cheez TV Official Facebook Page

Network 10 original programming
Television programming blocks in Australia
Australian children's television series
1995 Australian television series debuts
2005 Australian television series endings
Television shows set in Sydney
English-language television shows